Trinity School was a school for African Americans in Limestone County, Alabama and was in Athens, Alabama. It was founded by Mary Fletcher Wells. It was the only high school for black students in the county and the first school in the northern half of the state offering kindergarten for black children. It was relocated to Fort Henderson where a new school building was built in 1907 on the ruins of Fort Henderson and succeeded a wooden school building on the site.

The school was sponsored by the Western Freedmen’s Aid Commission and then the American Missionary Association. In 1865 it was in a Baptist church. Wells initially taught under the protection of armed guards.  The school had an integrated faculty by 1892. Wells would teach, can fruits and vegetables for the winter, and return north to raise funds for the school in the summers. She remained at the school for twenty-seven years.  

The school was transferred from the AMA to the state of Alabama in 1950. Additional school property followed six years later. Trinity was closed after court-ordered desegregation in 1970.

Legacy
A historical marker by the cistern that served the 1865-1907 school building commemorates the school's history. A historical marker is also located at the Fort Henderson site. There have been efforts to preserve and restore what remains of the school sites and buildings.

Alumni
Patti Malone
C. Eric Lincoln
George Ruffin: Bridgeforth, Tuskegee Institute professor and agriculture department head
B.F. Foster, pastor at First Congregational Church in Little Rock, Arkansas
Ross Baity, painter whose work includes a mural of Athens

References

High schools in Alabama
Historically segregated African-American schools in Alabama
Limestone County, Alabama